Clivinini is a tribe of ground beetles in the family Carabidae. There are more than 70 genera and 1,200 described species in Clivinini.

Genera
For a list of genera in Clivinini, see Scaritinae.

References

External links

 

Scaritinae